Fin Shepard is a fictional character and the protagonist of the Sharknado film series. He is a former surfer and shark hunter, who is played by Ian Ziering in all the films. He is a positive hero, protecting his family and the rest of the world from the evil sharks and hurricanes that bring sharks from the sea to land.

History

Sharknado 
Fin Shepard's life before the events of the first film is unknown. It is only known that Fin was a surfer and rested on the beach of Los Angeles with his friends Baz and Nova. Suddenly, a waterspout arrived from the sea, which brought a thousand sharks to Los Angeles, which in turn began killing people and destroying houses. Fin together with friends go in search of his ex-wife April and his teenage daughter Claudia. During the trip to the family, the group of Fin stops on the way to save people, because they are attacked by sharks due to floods. During the journey, George and Colleen were killed. Having found their family, Alex Matt Fin's son joins them and they flee and hide in a warehouse, where they come up with a plan to stop the tornade, namely, to blow them up. During the operation, Nova and Matt take a helicopter with bombs and blow two tornadoes out of three, but Nova drops out of a helicopter during a battle with a shark and Matt loses the last bomb. Eventually, Fin himself destroys the last tornado with a bomb attached to his car, and all the sharks begin to fall on the ground. One falling shark flies straight to the rest of the group. Fin jumps into the mouth of one of them and using a chainsaw cuts a shark's belly, thereby freeing himself and Nova. Nova and Matt are happy, and Fin is reuniting with April again.

Sharknado 2: The Second One 
After the events of the first film, Fin is possible before the events of the Sharknado 2 in a row, wrote a new book and decided to fly to New York with April to present his book. However, there are new tornadoes, also filled with sharks, and one of them gets a plane Fin and April. Bursting on board, sharks kill pilots and many passengers. However, Fin manages to land the plane, and his wife loses her hand. Suddenly they fell on the City Field, and the two Sharks of the Tornado unite in huge curtains. Fin and his childhood friend Skye are trying to destroy them with bombs, just like last time, April comes from the hospital with a circular saw instead of a hand.  (Referring to Ash from Evil Dead)  Skye sacrifices herself, allowing Finn and April to destroy Shark Tornado. They explode freon cylinders, destroying all marine predators. Finn manages to ride the great white shark with chains and put it on the antenna. In one of the dead sharks, he finds April's hand with a wedding ring. He takes it and offers his ex-wife to renew their marriage, and she agrees. After that, Fin becomes a hero, April gets pregnant again and flies to Florida / Florida last month. Eight months later, Fin arrives in Washington, where he receives the Presidential Medal of Freedom for his feat in New York, when a new shark tornado collapses in Washington.

Sharknado 3: Oh Hell No! 
The tornado destroys the White House, and sharks kill several guests of honor of the ceremony, guards and the president, so Fin is now in charge of his life. He kills dozens of sharks, and then the tornado suddenly disappears. Fin decides to go to Florida to inform his family about the next whirlwind, but all flights from Washington are canceled, so Fin takes the car to get to Orlando. Along the way, he again gets into a shark tornado and meets Nova with Lucas. Fin, Nova and Lucas are sent on a specially equipped bus to the south, in Orlando. Eventually the trio gets to a military air base located near Charleston. Its commander is General Gottlieb and an old acquaintance of Fin's. He shows Fin his old plane, now used for training flights. The shark tornado attacks the base and Lucas dies, after activating the anti-shark device on the bus Fin and Nova take off, continuing on their way to Orlando. After some time, Fin and Nova fly up to the track “Daytona 500”, where the race is held NASCAR ”, and at the same time a shark tornado covers the track. Fin and Nova dump a spare fuel tank into the center of the tornado and blow it up, weakening the tornado and destroying the sharks in it. One of the sharks is facing a fighter and he loses control. Fin barely puts the plane into the water at Universal Orlando and together, Novaya goes ashore. Soon the family of Fina was again assembled: he finds his wife, daughter and mother-in-law May. Fin with his family and Nova are sent to Cape Canaveral on racing cars. On the way, they visit a restaurant where Fin communicates with his father, Colonel Gilbert Shepherd NASA. For the destruction of shark tornadoes over East Coast that can connect and become incredibly destructive, you need the help of the military. For this, Fin expects to use Space Shuttle.

Fin and his father are going to start off on a spacecraft into space, but April is trying to dissuade her husband from this insane antics. As a result, three astronauts are on the shuttle, not two, and the launch is canceled due to a closely approaching tornado. Comes to the aid of Nova, taking off on a fighter. The space shuttle takes off, the astronauts drop a bomb and a full external space shuttle on a tornado, explode them, and Fin and his father go into orbit. Because of the tornado, the colonel suggests using the power of satellites. The colonel takes off to the satellite and uses a pillar of fire from the satellite to destroy the shark tornado. It turns out that there is little fuel in the canoe, and therefore there is no possibility to pick up the colonel from the IDF satellite; and then the shuttle is attacked by sharks in space. April's huge shark swallows whole, but Fin, leaving behind the crumbling ship, rushes to the shark with a jetpack and swallows him whole. Then, using parachutes, Fin makes a soft landing inside the Entering the atmosphere of a charred shark. He and a shark get out of a shark, and then April gives birth to a son, which they, along with Fin, call in honor of Gilber's grandfather. Suddenly, in April falls a certain spacecraft. After this, many, including Fin himself, believed that she was dead. However, in fourth film it turns out that she still survived.

Sharknado: The 4th Awakens 
In the five years since the previous film, Fin has moved to a farm in Kansas named "April's Acres," where he lives with his mother Raye and young son Gil. April is believed dead after being crushed by the wreckage of the space shuttle. Tech mogul Aston Reynolds (based on Tesla, Inc. co-founder and SpaceX founder Elon Musk) has developed a new type of high-speed space travel with his company Astro-X (a play on SpaceX), which was used to save Fin's father, Colonel Gilbert Shepard, from the moon. Astro-X has also developed a technology that is capable of using radio waves to diffuse tornadoes, leading to the end of the sharknado phenomenon.

Fin travels to Molong with his cousin Gemini to meet up with his son Matt, who has returned from deployment in Iraq. Meanwhile, Reynolds has built and is opening a shark-themed hotel featuring a giant tank of sharks. While Matt and his fiancée, Gabrielle, marry and skydive from a plane, a sandstorm tornado develops that cannot be diffused by Astro-X. The tornado absorbs the water and sharks from Reynolds' hotel, creating the first sharknado in five years.

Sharknado 5: Global Swarming 
Following the events of the previous film, Fin and April travel to London with their young son Gil to attend a NATO meeting regarding the escalating sharknado threat. Meanwhile, Nova and her assistants investigate a temple hidden beneath Stonehenge, and Nova summons Fin to aid her. They discover a shrine dedicated to an ancient shark god and collect an artifact, which has the unforeseen consequence of unleashing a new type of sharknado with a dimensional vortex inside it. The sharknado heads toward London, and Fin rallies the Buckingham Palace guards to defeat it. They manage to survive the sharknado, but Gil is pulled into the storm and vanishes.

The Last Sharknado: It's About Time 
Immediately following the events of the previous film, with Earth completely devastated from the global sharknado swarm, Fin and his now-adult son Gil travel back 66 million years to the Cretaceous in order to prevent the first sharknado and destroy the phenomena once and for all. Shortly after arriving, Gil vanishes; Fin learns from a message recorded by Gil earlier that due to the instability of the energy needed to time travel, any individual person can only travel back in time once, with any subsequent trips resulting in their disappearance. Travelling forward through time, Fin thwarts Sharknados in Camelot, the War of Independence, and the Wild West, as well as making a trip to a shark-controlled future where he is nearly captured by an android duplicate of April who seeks to create a world of just android doubles of them both. Escaping the android, Fin is able to return to the past and uses the android to destroy the first Sharknado before it can fully form, creating a new timeline where Earth has never been decimated by the Sharknados, Fin once again the bartender he was at the beginning surrounded by his extended family.

Other appearances 
 Fin Shepard appears as a cameo in the film Lavalantula by the same actor - Ian Ziering. In this film, the other main character, Colton West, asks Fin for help, but Fin has his hands full, so he refuses to help and leaves.
 Fin also received a cameo in the Archie vs. Sharknado comic.
 Fin Shepard is a playable character in Sharknado: The Video Game.
 Fin Shepard appears in a short cameo in the film Ready Player One, where he is among the fighters for the freedom of the OASIS and cuts the “sixes” with his chainsaw.

References

Film characters introduced in 2013
Male horror film characters
Sharknado (film series)